Moravian  is the adjective form of the Czech Republic region of Moravia, and refers to people of ancestry from Moravia.

Moravian may also refer to:
 a member or adherent of the Moravian Church, one of the oldest Protestant denominations
 Moravia, the region
 Moravians, people from Moravia
 Moravian dialects, dialects of Czech spoken in Moravia, sometimes considered a distinct Moravian language
 Moravané ("The Moravians"), a political party in the Czech Republic favouring the autonomy or independence of Moravia
 Moravian Academy, a private school in Bethlehem, Pennsylvania
 Moravian University, a private university in Bethlehem, Pennsylvania
 an inhabitant of the Scottish Moray, especially the historic Mormaer of Moray

See also
 Moravia (disambiguation)
 Moravian Serbia, one of the Serbian states that emerged from the collapse of the Serbian Empire in the 14th century
 Moravian Wallachia, a cultural region in the eastern part of the Czech Republic
 Moravian Slovakia, a cultural region in the southeastern part of the Czech Republic, closely related to neighbouring Slovakia
 Moravian Church, Protestant denomination established in fifteenth century in historic region of Moravia
 Moravian Cemetery, a cemetery on Staten Island, NYC
 Moravian chicken pie
 Moravian Spice Cookies
 Moravian star, is an illuminated Advent or Christmas decoration popular in Germany and areas with Moravian Churches
 Moravian 47, Ontario, a First Nations reserve located in Chatham-Kent Ontario, Canada
 Moraviantown (disambiguation)

Language and nationality disambiguation pages